Mudassar Mahmood  Naaru is a Pakistani journalist, poet and blogger. He has been missing since 2018.

Disappearance and aftermath
Mudassar was reported missing from the Balakot area of Khyber Pakhtunkhwa in 2018, had gone there with his wife Sadaf and six-month-old son Sachal for sightseeing.

In May 2021 Naro's wife Sadaf died of a heart attack.

In December 2021, Prime Minister Imran Khan called on the family of the Mudassar Naro and directed the government officials to submit a detailed report on their whereabouts and disappearances.

See also
 Idris Khattak
 List of people who disappeared

References

2010s missing person cases
Living people
Missing people
Missing person cases in Pakistan
Pakistani bloggers
Pakistani journalists
Pakistani male journalists
Pakistani male poets
Year of birth missing (living people)